Ron 'Snowy' Boooth was an Australian rugby league player in the New South Wales Rugby League (NSWRL) competition.

Booth, a goal-kicking fullback, played for the Eastern Suburbs club in the years 1952 to 1956. He was recruited from the Randwick rugby union club.

In 1953, Booth made one of the club's rare semi-finals appearances during that period. It was Easts' first semi-final since winning the 1945 premiership. The euphoria was short lived however, with the Tri-colours losing to the St George Dragons, 25 points to 7, with Booth kicking two goals.

References
 
 NSW Rugby League Finals, Steve Haddan

Year of birth missing
Year of death missing
Australian rugby league players
Sydney Roosters players
Rugby league fullbacks
Place of birth missing